Wigtown was a railway station on the Wigtownshire Railway branch line, from Newton Stewart to Whithorn, of the Portpatrick and Wigtownshire Joint Railway. It served a rural area in Wigtownshire. The station closed for passengers in 1950, and to goods in 1964.

History

The Portpatrick and Wigtownshire Joint Railway was formed from the amalgamation of two railway companies: The Portpatrick Railway and the Wigtownshire Railway, which got into financial difficulties; they merged and were taken over.

The single-platform station stood off the Harbour Road. It had a ticket office and waiting room, a stationmaster's house that still survives (datum 2013), a goods shed, a weighing machine, passing loop, crane, and several sidings.

Other stations
 Newton Stewart - junction
 Causewayend
 Kirkinner
 Whauphill
 Sorbie
 Millisle
 Garlieston
 Broughton Skeog
 Whithorn
 List of closed railway stations in Britain

References 
Notes

Sources
 
 Casserley, H.C.(1968). Britain's Joint Lines. Shepperton: Ian Allan. .

External links
 Disused stations
 G&SWR 
 Wigtown
 Wigtown Station buildings
 RailScot - Wigtown Station

Disused railway stations in Dumfries and Galloway
Former Portpatrick and Wigtownshire Joint Railway stations
Railway stations in Great Britain opened in 1877
Railway stations in Great Britain closed in 1950
Wigtown